Guranabad-e Pashai (also Romanized as Gūrānābād-e Pāshā'ī) is a village in Solduz Rural District, in the Central District of Naqadeh County, West Azerbaijan Province, Iran. At the 2006 census, its population was 60, in 17 families.

References 

Populated places in Naqadeh County